This list of solar eclipses seen from Ukraine enumerates the solar eclipses that were seen and will be seen in Ukraine.

Twenty-first century 
 Solar eclipse of May 31, 2003
 Solar eclipse of October 3, 2005
 Solar eclipse of March 29, 2006
 Solar eclipse of August 1, 2008
 Solar eclipse of January 15, 2010
 Solar eclipse of January 4, 2011
 Solar eclipse of March 20, 2015
 Solar eclipse of June 21, 2020
 Solar eclipse of June 10, 2021
 Solar eclipse of October 25, 2022
 Solar eclipse of March 29, 2025
 Solar eclipse of August 12, 2026
 Solar eclipse of August 2, 2027
 Solar eclipse of June 12, 2029
 Solar eclipse of June 1, 2030 (annular)
 Solar eclipse of March 20, 2034
 Solar eclipse of January 16, 2037
 Solar eclipse of January 5, 2038
 Solar eclipse of July 2, 2038
 Solar eclipse of June 21, 2039
 Solar eclipse of June 11, 2048 (annular)
 Solar eclipse of November 14, 2050
 Solar eclipse of September 12, 2053
 Solar eclipse of November 5, 2059
 Solar eclipse of April 30, 2060
 Solar eclipse of April 20, 2061 (total)
 Solar eclipse of February 5, 2065
 Solar eclipse of July 3, 2065
 Solar eclipse of April 21, 2069
 Solar eclipse of September 12, 2072
 Solar eclipse of January 27, 2074
 Solar eclipse of July 13, 2075
 Solar eclipse of November 26, 2076
 Solar eclipse of May 1, 2079
 Solar eclipse of September 13, 2080
 Solar eclipse of September 3, 2081
 Solar eclipse of February 27, 2082
 Solar eclipse of April 21, 2088
 Solar eclipse of February 18, 2091
 Solar eclipse of July 23, 2093 (annular)

Ukraine
Astronomical observatories in Ukraine
Solar eclipses